"Answer" is FLOW's twelfth single. The title track was used as opening theme song for the live action Detective School Q television series. It reached #7 on the Oricon charts in its first week and charted for 12 weeks.

Track listing

References

2007 songs
Ki/oon Music singles
Flow (band) songs
Song articles with missing songwriters